Granulobasidium vellereum is a species of fungus in the family Cyphellaceae. A plant pathogen associated with white rot of angiospermous logs, slash, and living trees, it has been found in Sweden and Denmark, and in North America. Originally described as Corticium vellereum in 1885, it was transferred to the genus Granulobasidium by Walter Jülich in 1979.

References

Fungi described in 1885
Fungi of Europe
Fungi of North America
Fungal tree pathogens and diseases
Agaricales